Differential phase is a kind of linearity distortion which affects the color hue in TV broadcasting.

Composite color video signal 

Composite color video signal (CCVS) consists of three terms:
Monochrome (luminance) signal
Auxiliary signals (sync pulse and blanking signals )
Color signal, which is actually a subcarrier modulated by chroma information
The first two terms are usually called composite video signal (CVS)

The modulation technique of the color subcarrier is quadrature amplitude modulation (QAM) both in PAL and NTSC systems. The amplitude of the color signal represents the saturation of the color and  the phase lag of the color signal with respect to a certain reference which is called colorburst represents the hue; i.e.,  each phase lag is assigned for a different color hue. So, in order to reproduce the original color in the receiver, the phase difference between the colorburst and the color signal must be kept constant throughout the broadcasting.

The colorburst 
 

The colorburst is a 10 period signal of color carrier (3.58 MHz in System M and 4.43 MHz in System B and System G). It is superimposed on the back porch of the CVS. The peak to peak amplitude is about 300 mV. That means that, when the color signal has a low luminance, its DC component  is comparable to that of the colorburst. All dark colors have more or less the same DC component as the colorburst. But light colors have a higher  luminance and hence a higher DC component.

Differential phase distortion 

During broadcasting, the inherent non linearity in electronic devices may cause a level dependent phase shift. Differential phase distortion (DP or dP) is the shift of color signal phase with respect to the colorburst phase. When DC levels of the light colors and the colorburst are different, the hue of the light colors may change. Especially a slight change in skin color may be irritating to the viewers. (too yellow or too red skin color depending on whether shift is positive or negative)

PAL system 

To solve the problem of differential phase distortion in PAL system, the polarity of both the colorburst and the color signal are reversed in each consecutive lines. So in odd lines the phase of the colorburst leads and in the even lines the phase of the color signal leads. However, if there is DP distortion in the system,  the shift caused by DP has always the same polarity, thus the overall shift is more than the original in even line and less than the original in the odd line by the same amount. The average of two lines yields the original  phase difference and thus the color.

The mathematics involved is as follows:

Let  be the phase difference of the color signal with respect to colorburst and  be  the extra shift introduced by DP.

The original signal is

 
If there is a DP distortion, the received signal for the first line is

 

In the second line (after multiplying by -1)

 

The average is

 

See also 
Differential gain

References 

Broadcasting
Television technology